Pełczyce may refer to the following places in Poland:
Pełczyce, a town in West Pomeranian Voivodeship (NW Poland)
Pełczyce, Oława County in Lower Silesian Voivodeship (south-west Poland)
Pełczyce, Wrocław County in Lower Silesian Voivodeship (south-west Poland)
Pełczyce, Świętokrzyskie Voivodeship (south-central Poland)